Rice flour (also rice powder) is a form of flour made from finely milled rice. It is distinct from rice starch, which is usually produced by steeping rice in lye. Rice flour is a common substitute for wheat flour. It is also used as a thickening agent in recipes that are refrigerated or frozen since it inhibits liquid separation.

Rice flour may be made from either white rice or brown rice. To make the flour, the husk of rice or paddy is removed and raw rice is obtained, which is then ground to flour.

Types and names

By rice 
Rice flour can be made from indica, japonica, and wild rice varieties. Usually, rice flour refers to flour made from non-glutinous white rice.

When made with glutinous rice (or sweet rice), it is called glutinous rice flour or sweet rice flour (Japanese: 白玉粉; romanized: shiratamako). In Japan, the glutinous rice flour produced from ground cooked glutinous rice, used to make mochi, is called mochigomeko (or mochiko for short). In comparison to the glutinous rice flour, non-glutinous rice flour (Japanese: 上新粉; romanized: jōshinko) can be specified as so.

When made with brown rice with only the inedible outer hull removed, it is called brown rice flour. Flour made from black, red, and green rice are each called as black rice flour, red rice flour, green rice flour. In comparison to brown rice flour, white rice flour can be specified as so.

By milling methods 
Different milling methods also produce different types of rice flour. Rice flour can be dry-milled from dry rice grains, or wet-milled from rice grains that were soaked in water prior to milling. Usually, "rice flour" refers dry-milled rice flour, which can be stored on a shelf. In Korea, wet-milled rice flour is made from rice that was soaked in water, drained, ground using a stone-mill, and then optionally sifted. Like moderately moist sand, wet-milled rice flour forms an easily breakable lump when squeezed with hand. It is usually stored in freezer. In the Philippines, rice flour is not traditionally prepared dry.

Uses

Culinary 

Rice flour can be used to make confections like rice cakes, macaroons and some types of buns due to the texture and flavor it lends the finished products. It is also used for dusting confections in a manner similar to powdered sugar.

East Asia 
In Japan, cooked glutinous rice flour mochigomeko (or mochiko for short) is used to create mochi or as a thickener for sauces. Uncooked glutinous rice flour shiratamako is often used to produce confectioneries. The non-glutinous rice flour jōshinko is primarily used for creating confectioneries.

In Korea, rice flour made from different rice varieties and with different milling methods are used for different types of tteok (rice cakes) and hangwa (confections). Glutinous rice flour chapssal-garu is used for making chapssal-tteok (glutinous rice cakes), gochujang (chili paste), as well as rice glue for kimchi.

Southeast Asia 
In the Philippines, glutinous rice dough galapóng is the basis for numerous types of native rice cakes and desserts (kakanin). Depending on the dish, coconut milk (gata), wood ash lye, and various other ingredients may be added to the galapóng. The galapóng can be prepared baked, steamed, boiled, or fried, resulting in dishes like puto or bibingka.

South Asia 
In South India, rice flour is used for dishes like dosa, puttu, golibaje (mangalore bajji) and kori rotti. It is also mixed with wheat, millet, other cereal flours, and sometimes dried fruits or vegetables to make manni, a kind of baby food.. Rice flour is used to make bhakari in the Konkan region in western India.

In Bangladesh, rice flour is a regular ingredient. In Bengali and Assamese cuisine of eastern India, it is used in making roti and desserts such as sandesh and pitha (Rice cakes or pancakes which are sometimes steamed, deep fried or pan fried and served along with grated coconut, sesame seeds, jaggery and chashni). It is also used in making Kheer (a common dessert in Indian subcontinent).

In Sri Lanka, it's used in making many household food products. Also it can be used in making bread and other bakery products.

In Nepal, Newars use rice flour to make yomari and chataamari. Sel roti is another popular rice flour based food commonly eaten in Nepal and in the Sikkim and Darjeeling regions of India. Sel roti is known as Shinghal in Kumaon.

Other 
Rice flour is also used in the Central American dish pupusas as a substitute to regular flour.

Non-culinary

Cosmetics 
Rice flour is used in the cosmetics industry.

Mushroom cultivation 
Brown rice flour can be combined with vermiculite for use as a substrate for the cultivation of mushrooms. Hard cakes of colonised substrate can then be fruited in a humid container. This method is often (though not always) employed by growers of edible mushrooms, as it is a very simple and low-cost method of growing mushrooms.

References

External links
 Japanese rice flours at japanesericeflour.com

Bangladeshi cuisine
Burmese cuisine
Cambodian cuisine
Chinese cuisine
Flour
Indian cuisine
Indonesian cuisine
Japanese cuisine
Korean cuisine
Lao cuisine
Malaysian cuisine
Philippine cuisine
Rice
Rice products
Sri Lankan cuisine
Thai cuisine
Vietnamese cuisine
Hawaiian cuisine
Palauan cuisine